The Debaters is a Canadian radio comedy show currently hosted by Steve Patterson. It airs on CBC Radio One.

Each episode typically features two debates between two pairs of debaters. The topics are deliberately comedic, with the winner chosen by audience reaction at the end of the debate.

Season 1 (2006-2007) (32 episodes)
This is a list of episodes from season one of The Debaters on CBC Radio.
All season-one episodes were hosted by Shaun Majumder.

Season 2 (2007-2008) (32 episodes)
This is a list of episodes from season two of The Debaters on CBC Radio.
The season featured a revolving door of guest hosts, including Sean Cullen, Roman Danylo, Patrick McKenna and future regular host Steve Patterson.

Season 3 (2008-2009) (33 episodes)
This is a list of episodes from season three of The Debaters on CBC Radio.
The third season was hosted by Steve Patterson.

Season 4 (2009-2010) (33 episodes)
This is a list of episodes from season four of The Debaters on CBC Radio.
All season four episodes were hosted by Steve Patterson.

Season 5 (2010-2011) (34 episodes)
This is a list of episodes from season five of The Debaters on CBC Radio.
All season five episodes were hosted by Steve Patterson.

Season 6 (2011-2012) (33 episodes)
This is a list of episodes from season six of The Debaters on CBC Radio.
All season six episodes were hosted by Steve Patterson.

Season 7 (2012-2013) (33 episodes)
This is a list of the 33 episodes from season seven of The Debaters on CBC Radio.
All season seven episodes were hosted by Steve Patterson.

Season 8 (2013-2014) (31 episodes + 4 extended cut debates)
This is a list of episodes from season eight of The Debaters on CBC Radio.
All season eight episodes were hosted by Steve Patterson.

Season 9 (2014-2015) (33 episodes)
This is a list of episodes from season nine of The Debaters on CBC Radio.
All season nine episodes were hosted by Steve Patterson.
At the close of season nine, a total of 294 episodes (plus four extended debates) had aired.

Season 10 (2015-2016) (33 episodes)
This is a list of episodes from season ten of The Debaters on CBC Radio.
All season ten episodes were hosted by Steve Patterson.
At the close of season ten, a total of 327 episodes (plus four extended debates) had aired.
Season 10 is the first season broken into two parts by CBC. All subsequent seasons have also been split into two parts.

Season 10: Part I (2015) (12 episodes)
Part one aired in 2015 (and was released on iTunes December 21, 2015) and consisted of 12 episodes (episodes 1-12).

Season 10: Part II (2016) (21 episodes)
Part two of season ten aired in 2016 (released on iTunes July 23, 2016) and consisted of 21 episodes (episodes 13-33).

Total (327 episodes + 4 extended debates)
327 total episodes have aired through ten seasons, plus four extended debates aired in season eight.
Also a number of "re-edits" have aired, combining debates from different episodes into new episodes.

References

CBC Radio One programs